Noćaj (pronounced  ) is a village in northern Serbia. It is located in the Sremska Mitrovica municipality, in the Syrmia District, Vojvodina province. Geographically, it is situated in the Mačva region. The population of Noćaj is 1,866 people (according to the 2011 census), and most of its inhabitants are ethnic Serbs.

Geography

Geographically, the settlement is located in the northern part of Macva, while administratively it belongs to the Autonomous province of Vojvodina.

The Zasavica (bog) partly belongs to the area of Noćaj. This reserve is a wetland area with floodplain meadows and forests of 1825 hectares, today known for beavers.

The area of northern Macva is of a plain-swampy character, suitable for field and vegetable growing.

It is directly connected to the European route E70 via the State road 20, to the north, while it is connected to the Badovinci border crossing to the south.

Demographics

Famous residents

It is known as the place of origin of Stojan Čupić (hero of The First Serbian Uprising). He was called 'Zmaj od Noćaja' ("the dragon of Noćaj" in English). The football club from Noćaj is called 'Zmaj'.

See also
List of places in Serbia
List of cities, towns and villages in Vojvodina

References

Slobodan Ćurčić, Broj stanovnika Vojvodine, Novi Sad, 1996.

Populated places in Vojvodina
Mačva
Sremska Mitrovica